Sifakis is a Greek surname that may refer to
George Sifakis, American government official
Joseph Sifakis (born 1946), Greek-French computer scientist
Myron Sifakis (born 1960), Greek football goalkeeper
Michalis Sifakis (born 1984), Greek football goalkeeper

Greek-language surnames
Surnames